Fellows of the Royal Society elected in 1998.

Fellows

Brian Stewart Worthington  (d. 2007)
Colin Atkinson
David James Purslove Barker
Jean Duthie Beggs
Harshad Bhadeshia
David Keith Bowen
Roger John Cashmore
Andrew John Casson
Thomas Cavalier-Smith
David William Clarke
Enrico Coen
Stephen Arthur Cook
Sir Peter Robert Crane
Richard Michael Denton
Raymond Allen Dwek
Charles Porter Ellington
Richard Bailey Flavell
Kenneth Charles Freeman
Brian Mellor Greenwood
John Philip Grime
David Colin Hanna
Geoffrey Everest Hinton
George Steven Martin
Raghunath Anant Mashelkar
Yoshio Masui
Ronald Charles Newman
Mark Brian Pepys
Trevor Charles Platt
Raymond Alan Plumb
Richard John Puddephatt
Philip Charles Ruffles
Anthony Walter Segal
Ashoke Sen
Jonathan Sprent
James Staunton
Sir John Michael Taylor
Robert Kemeys Thomas
Cheryll Anne Tickle
Srinivasa Varadhan
Bernard John Wood

Foreign members

John Edward Casida
Elias James Corey
Walter Kohn
Oliver Smithies
Rolf Martin Zinkernagel

References

1998
1998 in science
1998 in the United Kingdom